Jiří Musil (born 21 June 1965) is a Czech speed skater. He competed in three events at the 1992 Winter Olympics.

References

1965 births
Living people
Czech male speed skaters
Olympic speed skaters of Czechoslovakia
Speed skaters at the 1992 Winter Olympics
Sportspeople from Prague